Peithona prionoides is a species of beetle in the family Cerambycidae, and the only species in the genus Peithona.

References

Dorcasominae
Monotypic beetle genera